Jamey Rootes (May 9, 1966 – August 21, 2022) was an American sports executive. He served as a long-term president of the Houston Texans of the National Football League. He was responsible for the business operations of the team. Before joining the Texans, he was president and general manager of the Columbus Crew of Major League Soccer. He went to Clemson University, where he was a member of the Beta Theta Pi fraternity and played on the soccer team that won national championships both in 1984 and 1987. He earned an MBA at Indiana University Bloomington, where he also served as an assistant soccer coach. Rootes worked for the Texans for over 20 years before announcing his resignation in February 2021. Rootes worked as chief executive officer of the Houston Dynamo FC of Major League Soccer and Houston Dash of National Women's Soccer League before stepping down 18 days later. Rootes died on August 21, 2022, at the age of 56.

References

1966 births
2022 deaths
Clemson Tigers men's soccer players
Columbus Crew
Houston Texans executives
Major League Soccer executives
National Football League team presidents
People from Stone Mountain, Georgia
Association footballers not categorized by position
American sports executives and administrators
Association football players not categorized by nationality